DeLisa Chinn-Tyler is a retired American softball outfielder. Chinn-Tyler, who is Black, appeared in an "iconic" scene in the 1992 movie A League of Their Own, playing a bystander who throws back an overthrown ball from Bosse Field's first base bullpen to white actor Geena Davis at homeplate, then giving Davis a glance full of meaning.

Chinn-Tyler, who is from Evansville, Indiana, played softball competitively from 1971, when she was 11, sometimes joining Little League baseball teams when there were no softball teams available to play for. She eventually played for the Express, a slow-pitch softball team that according to WJCT "dominated regional games and tournaments" in the 1970s and 1980s. She played for Jackie Joyner Kersee's team Prime Time. She was known for her ability to throw runners out at first base from center field and according to WJCT was a "double threat on offense". She retired from softball at age 52, at which time she was still playing outfield.  

Chinn-Tyler, then 31, was cast in the 1992 movie A League of Their Own, which was filmed primarily in Evansville, after she answered an open casting call advertised in the local paper. At the tryouts she was told there were no parts for Black women due to the fact that at the time the film was set the sport was not integrated, but director Penny Marshall was at the tryouts that day, saw Chinn-Tyler play, and decided to write her into the film. 

In the scene, a ball is overthrown and lands near the first base bullpen, where a small crowd of Black spectators are standing to watch the game in the segregated stadium. Chinn-Tyler walks forward, picks up the ball, and throws it to Davis at home plate; the throw is clearly a mighty one. Chinn-Tyler recalls being told to throw the ball to Davis, then "give her a look that said that Black women could play also". According to Collider, the scene references pitcher Mamie Johnson, one of three women to break the gender barrier in the Negro leagues. The scene takes less than 15 seconds but is a critical and "iconic" moment in the film. Chinn-Tyler was paid $750 for the part; she recalls having been told the part would be credited, but it wasn't. 

As of 2022 Chinn-Tyler was working as a team leader at Toyota Motor Manufacturing Indiana.

References 

American softball players
People from Indiana
Year of birth missing (living people)
Living people